Sarah Keyworth (born 6 April 1993) is an English stand-up comedian based in London. Keyworth went full time in 2018 after being nominated for best newcomer at the 2018 Edinburgh Comedy Awards. Their TV work includes Live at the Apollo, and they created a four part radio series titled  Are You a Boy or a Girl?.

Early life
Keyworth grew up in Nottingham and attended De Montfort University in Leicester, as an undergraduate in Drama Studies between 2011 and 2014 and being active in the Comedy Society there. They got a marketing internship at London Academy of Music and Dramatic Art and worked as a nanny.

Career

Keyworth used to create shows with their brother when they were children and went on to perform comedy while at university, and emerged as a runner-up at the 2015 Funny Women. Keyworth's first show, "Dark Horse", was nominated for best newcomer at the 2018 Edinburgh Comedy Awards.

Keyworth was named Newcomer of the Year at the 2019 Chortle Awards. Their second show, "Pacific", debuted in 2019.

On TV and radio, Keyworth has appeared on Roast Battle, The Stand Up Sketch Show, The Now Show, The Dog Ate My Homework, Mock The Week and 8 Out of 10 Cats. In 2019, they were a winner of the reality series Celebrity Coach Trip.

In 2019 they performed at the Glastonbury Festival.

In 2020, Keyworth created a four-part comedy series for BBC Radio 4, titled Are You a Boy or a Girl?, which explored gender fluidity. It was recorded with a virtual audience over Zoom, and broadcast in November.

In 2021 Keyworth appeared on BBC's Live at the Apollo.

Keyworth's 2022 show "Lost Boy" debuted at the Edinburgh Fringe in August.

Personal life

Keyworth dated Catherine Bohart, also a stand-up comedian; they met in 2015. The couple's relationship ended in 2020. In 2022, Keyworth shared that they are non-binary, and use she/he/they pronouns.

Keyworth's favourite comedian is Jennifer Saunders.

Notes

References

External links

English comedians
Living people
1993 births
Lesbian comedians
Jewish English comedians
Non-binary comedians
People from Nottingham
Alumni of De Montfort University
21st-century English comedians
English stand-up comedians